Branko Gračanin (born 19 October 1943 in Zagreb, Kingdom of Yugoslavia) is a Croatian retired football player.

International career
He made his debut for Yugoslavia in a December 1968 friendly match away against Brazil and earned a total of 10 caps, scoring 1 goal. His final international was an April 1970 friendly against Hungary.

References

External links
 
Profile on Serbian federation official site

1943 births
Living people
Footballers from Zagreb
Association football defenders
Yugoslav footballers
Yugoslavia international footballers
NK Trešnjevka players
GNK Dinamo Zagreb players
FC Istres players
FC Mulhouse players
SR Saint-Dié players
Yugoslav First League players
Ligue 2 players
Yugoslav expatriate footballers
Expatriate footballers in France
Yugoslav expatriate sportspeople in France